Zyryansky (masculine), Zyryanskaya (feminine), or Zyryanskoye (neuter) is the name of several rural localities in Russia:
Zyryansky (rural locality), a pochinok in Permassky Selsoviet of Nikolsky District of Vologda Oblast
Zyryanskoye, Sakhalin Oblast, a selo in Kholmsky District of Sakhalin Oblast
Zyryanskoye, Tomsk Oblast, a selo in Zyryansky District of Tomsk Oblast
Zyryanskaya, a village in Baykalovsky District of Sverdlovsk Oblast